The Sam Spiegel Film and Television School is a film and television school in Israel that was founded in 1989. It was renamed in honor of Sam Spiegel in 1996, with the support of the Sam Spiegel Estate.

The school has been the subject of some 190 tributes and retrospectives in 55 countries at international festivals, including the Museum of Modern Art in New York (1996), the Rotterdam Festival (1997), the Havana Festival (1999), the Moscow Festival (1999), the Valladolid Film Festival (Spain, 2000), FIPA Festival - Biarritz (France, 2004) the Berlin International Film Festival (2004), the Hamptons Festival (2005) and the Clermont-Ferrand International Short Film Festival in France (2005), and Sarajevo Film Festival (2008). In 2016 the Faculty of Asian and Middle Eastern Studies at Cambridge University held a tribute to the school. The School has been the subject of a number of tributes and retrospectives. The school's films have won 420 international and local prizes, including twice the First Prize at the Cannes Film Festival. In 2008 Anthem, by Elad Keidan was awarded First Prize in the Student Film competition at the prestigious Cinéfondation section. This marked the first ever such win by an Israeli student film in Cannes, and in 2015 Or Sinai won for her film Anna.

76% of the school's graduates work in the industry. Among the school’s most prominent alumni are Rama Burshtein, Nadav Lapid, Talya Lavie, Tom Shoval, Nir Bergman, Noah Stollman, Yehonatan Indursky, Amichai Chasson, Elad Keidan and Ra'anan Alexandrowicz.

The former director of the New York Film Festival, Richard Peña, said in 2011 at the tribute to the school at Columbia University: “Israeli cinema can be divided into two periods—before and after the establishment of the Sam Spiegel Film & Television School.”

History

In 1988, a student protest took place at the film department of the Beit Zvi School of Art in Ramat Gan, then the sole film school supported by the state. Charging that Beit Zvi gave preference to the acting track, the film students demanded independence. The Education and Culture Minister at the time, President Yitzhak Navon established a public inquiry that supported their claims. He then decided to create a new independent, well-funded school for film and television, the first of its kind in Israel.

The mayor of Jerusalem, Teddy Kollek, and Ruth Cheshin, president of the Jerusalem Foundation, saw a window of opportunity to “bring the ocean to Jerusalem”, in their words. They committed to match government funding. In July 1989, Ruth Cheshin charged film director Renen Schorr with the task of making this new school a reality in four months’ time. The school opened in Jerusalem in November 1989.

Renen Schorr served as the founding director of the school. He stepped down in November 2019. The board of directors then appointed Dana Blankstein Cohen to head the school.

In June 2021 Shir Shoshani was appointed deputy school director & head of the film and television department.

Educational tracks
The school works on a triangular model. One track is the "Full Track".

In 1999, the school began a two-year track for screenwriters, with the aim of creating a model for cooperation between screenwriters and directors, and with a specialization in writing for television.

In 2004, the first four-year track for entrepreneur producers in Israel was launched at the school.

Each of the three tracks operates autonomously. The school trains its students to reach a synergy of the tracks, leading to future cooperation beyond the school framework.

Milestones 
The school has worked to promote its students and graduates – and by extension Israeli film and international film in general.
 The Jerusalem Film and Television Fund was initiated in 2008 by Renen Schorr and is the first municipal film fund in Israel. Opening options for Israeli professionals and international filmmakers, the fund supports productions of films and television series shot in Jerusalem.
 The Sam Spiegel International Film Lab was launched in December 2011, with the goal of fostering the development and production of full-length feature films by some of the world’s most promising young talents. The Lab became the third film lab of its kind in the world, along with The Sundance Institute and The Torino Film Lab in Italy. The Academy Award-winning film Son of Saul, by László Nemes was developed at the Sam Spiegel International Film Lab in 2015.
 The Sam Spiegel Alumni Film Fund. Set up in 2014 in partnership with ARP Selection, France, with the aim of supporting alumni as they make their first feature film. Support from the Sam Spiegel Foundation, as well as the school, award $100,000 to a Sam Spiegel graduate in order to help produce a first feature film.
 The Ha’aretz Short Script Prize a partnership with the Ha’aretz newspaper was initiated in 2015. Partnering also with the Gesher Foundation, the prize is granted to the best original screenplay for a film under 10 min. The winning script is published in both the print and online editions, and is produced within nine months of receipt of the prize. The completed film premieres at the Jerusalem Film Festival.
 In 2017 an alliance between the school and SONY Classics was initiated. For the first time, as part of an annual venture, in April 2017, during the Tribeca Film Festival, SONY Classics chose four graduates of the Marcie Bloom Fellows and four graduates of the Sam Spiegel Film School for an active seminar in New York to create cooperation with leading film schools in the greater NY area.

References

External links
 The Sam Spiegel School Film and Television Homepage
 The Sam Spiegel School Film and Television Youtube Channel

 Cinephil- sales agent for the Sam Spiegel School's films
 20th Anniversary Video Clip
 Renen Schorr Are You Pleased With The Sam Spiegel School's Accomplishments- Haaretz
 Tracing Jerusalem's Footsteps Around the World - Haaretz 10.12.2013

Buildings and structures in Jerusalem
Film schools in Israel
Education in Jerusalem
Schools in Israel
Art schools in Israel
1989 establishments in Israel
Educational institutions established in 1989